Más Fuerte de lo Que Pensaba (Stronger Than I Thought) is the second studio album released by Mexican singer-songwriter Aleks Syntek and his band La Gente Normal. It was released by EMI Televisa Music on March 22, 1993.

Track listing
 "El Camino" - 4:12
 "Prefiero" - 3:33
 "Más Fuerte de lo Que Pensaba" - 4:16
 "Cuando Estoy Contigo" - 3:29
 "Nuestras Costumbres" - 3:39
 "Un Espacio Para Andar" - 4:32
 "Lo Perfecto" - 3:37
 "La Tierra Por Conquistar" - 4:14
 "Mis Impulsos Sobre Ti" - 4:33
 "La Historia de Un Hombre" - 3:48
 "Nadie Más Que Yo" - 3:48
 "Rompiendo la Rutina" - 4:27
 "En el Carnaval" - 3:44
 "Mis Impulsos Sobre Ti" – (acoustic version) - 3:12

1993 albums
Aleks Syntek albums
EMI Televisa Music albums